Szakoly is a village in Szabolcs-Szatmár-Bereg county, in the Northern Great Plain region of eastern Hungary. It is 135 miles (217 km) to the east of Budapest and 21 miles (33 km) to the north east of Debrecen. It is home to the Szakoly Power Plant. Szakoly was first mentioned in 1290.

Geography
There is a lake on the southern border of the settlement.

Average annual precipitation is about 560–590 mm, and the annual average temperature is between 9.5 to 9.6 °C (49.1 to 49.3 °F).

History 
Szakoly was first mentioned in 1290.

Inhabited area as early as the Avars age was built by B.C. II.-I. century. This is evidenced by several archaeological finds.

During the reign of King of Bela III. of Hungary, it was a hospital in Szakoly.

Here was a county assembly in 1320.

It were owned by the Zakoly family in 1487, hence the name of the settlement known today.

The Turks almost completely destroyed the settlement in the 18th century. As a border settlement, it was part of the Kingdom of Hungary and the Principality of Transylvania.

Szakoly was annexed to Romania for a year, only to return to Hungary again after the Trianon peace dictatorship in World War II. During the Horthy era, many emigrated to America (USA, Canada).

Szakoly's fire brigade was established in 1992.

Hungary's first greenfield biomass power plant was built here, with a production capacity of 19.8 MW. Operating since 2009, it is now owned and strategically important by the French Veolia Group.

Economy 

There is a biomass power plant in the village with a capacity of 19.8 MW. Operating since 2009, it is now owned and strategically important by the French Veolia Group.

Residents of the village work in the nearby towns industry (Major employers: LEGO, Michelin Tyres, Hübner H Rubber, Jasz Plastic in Nyíregyháza; TEVA Pharmaceutical, Gedeon Richter, BMW, GLOBUS, National Instruments, CATL in Debrecen; Coloplast, Unilever, Rosenberg in Nyirbator) and in agriculture (for example: apple, corn, wheat, melon, tobacco).

There is thermal water (60 ° C (140 °F)) under the Szakoly, but it is not utilized.

Education 
Arany János Primary School, Vocational School and High School

Education of the population 
32% be only primary school

35% must be skilled

25% have a secondary education (grammar school, technical school)

6% have a higher education degree (college, university)

2% to be illiterate

Religion

Health Care 
There is a Health Center in Szakoly, with a family doctor, a pharmacy, and a dentist.

Leisure activities 
Leisure programs are organized in the Básty Garden. There is also a riding stable. 
More important events, for example May Day (May 01.), Corn Festival (in August), Harvest Festival (in October), Tractor Parade (in December).

Sister cities 
Ardud, Romania

Orosi, Slovakia

Common surnames in the settlement 
Elek, Győri, Kiss, Kovács, Nagy, Szabó, Szűcs, Tóth, Vadon, Papp

Common surnames in the settlement 
Weisz, Lichtmann, Reizmann, Rozinger

Famous people 
Peter Parthenius - bishop (1592.)

Zsigmond Móricz - novelist and Social Realist (1898.)

References

Szakoly